Roselyne Lefrançois is a French politician and former Member of the European Parliament (MEP). She represented West France for the Socialist Party from 2007 until 2009.
She was appointed to fill the vacancy caused by the resignation of Marie-Line Reynaud

Parliamentary service
Member, Committee on Women's Rights and Gender Equality
Member, Committee on Civil Liberties, Justice and Home Affairs
Member, Delegation for relations with the United States

References

1950 births
Living people
Politicians from Saint-Malo
Socialist Party (France) MEPs
MEPs for France 2004–2009
21st-century women MEPs for France